The USSR Basketball Cup, or Soviet Union Basketball Cup, was the national basketball cup competition of the former Soviet Union. The first USSR Cup was held in the year 1949, and the last one was held in the year 1987. The competition was not held every year, as it was only contested 11 times between the years 1949 and 1987. However, it was initially held every year between 1949 and 1953.

The last team to win the cup was Spartak Leningrad, in 1987.

Title holders

 1948–49 Dinamo Tbilisi
 1949–50 Dinamo Tbilisi
 1950–51 Georgian SSR Team
 1951–52 Dinamo Riga
 1952–53 Žalgiris
 1953–68 Not held
 1968–69 Dinamo Tbilisi
 1969–71 Not held
 1971–72 CSKA Moscow
 1972–73 CSKA Moscow
 1973–77 Not held
 1977–78 Spartak Leningrad
 1978–81 Not held
 1981–82 CSKA Moscow
 1982–84 Not held
 1984–85 Shakhtar Donetsk.
 1985–86
 1986–87 Spartak Leningrad
 1987–92 Not held

The finals
For finals not played on a single match, * precedes the score of the team playing at home.

Performance by club

See also
Russian Professional Championship
VTB United League
Russian Professional League
Russian Super League 1
Russian Cup
USSR Premier League

References

External links
Sport-Express.ru 
SlamDunk.ru 

Basketball competitions in the Soviet Union
Defunct basketball cup competitions in Europe
Recurring sporting events established in 1949
1949 establishments in Europe
1987 disestablishments in Europe
Recurring sporting events disestablished in 1987